Dirab Air base is an airbase of the Saudi Arabian National Guard located south west of Riyadh, Riyadh Governorate, Saudi Arabia.

The base is home to the Center of Excellence and Aviation Training Brigade.

References

Airports in Saudi Arabia
2017 establishments in Saudi Arabia
Airports established in 2017